Bill Fritz (William Howard Fritz, Jr.;  March 22, 1892 – December 18, 1941) was an American track and field athlete who competed in the 1912 Summer Olympics. He was born in Berwyn, Pennsylvania. In 1912 he finished eighth in the pole vault event.

References

External links
profile

1892 births
1941 deaths
American male pole vaulters
Olympic track and field athletes of the United States
Athletes (track and field) at the 1912 Summer Olympics
Cornell Big Red football players
Haverford School alumni